Toney Fork is an unincorporated community in Wyoming County, West Virginia, United States.

The community takes its name from nearby Toney Fork creek.

References

Unincorporated communities in Wyoming County, West Virginia
Unincorporated communities in West Virginia